Shanghai Railway Station is an interchange station between lines 1, 3 and 4 on the Shanghai Metro. It is one of the stations where Line 3 and Line 4 share the same tracks and elevated platforms.

The transfer between Line 1 and lines 3 and 4 is actually quite long. Both metro stations are located on the opposing sides of the train station with a long tunnel connecting both platforms.

In addition to being an interchange between metro lines, the station facilitates transfer to Shanghai's main railway station. A tunnel leads directly from the concourse of the metro station to the concourse of the railway station.

This station served as the northern terminus of Line 1 before the extension to Gongfu Xincun opened on 28 December 2004.

Station layout

Places nearby 

 Shanghai railway station
 Shanghai Post Office
 Suzhou Creek
 Shanghai Art District in Moganshan Road (by taxi or longer walk)

References

Shanghai Metro stations in Jing'an District
Line 1, Shanghai Metro
Line 3, Shanghai Metro
Line 4, Shanghai Metro
Railway stations in China opened in 1995
Railway stations in Shanghai